Thomas Lynn Solhjem (born 1956) currently serves as the 25th Chief of Chaplains of the United States Army. Solhjem is the first ordained Assemblies of God minister to attain the position.

Education
Solhjem received a Bachelors of Arts in Pastoral Counseling and Specialized Ministries from North Central University in 1982. He completed a Masters of Divinity with Bethel Theological Seminary in 1988, and holds a second master's degree in Military Strategic Studies.

Military career
Solhjem began his military career in 1974 with the 82nd Combat Engineer Battalion. After serving on active duty for two years, he transferred to the Army Reserve, where he remained for fourteen years. After finishing his Masters of Divinity, he accessioned as an active duty chaplain in 1988.

Solhjem has given direct religious support to soldiers, totaling more than 68 months in combat zones. Prior to his appointment as the Deputy Chief of Chaplains, he served in various key leadership positions to include United States Army Forces Command (FORSCOM), Command Chaplain, Fort Bragg, North Carolina, as well as Command Chaplain, United States Special Operations Command, MacDill AFB, Florida.

In July 2015, Solhjem was promoted to brigadier general and assigned as the 25th Deputy Chief of Chaplains of the United States Army. In May 2019, Colonel William Green Jr., an African American Baptist minister, was nominated to succeed him as Deputy Chief of Chaplains. On May 31, 2019, Solhjem was promoted to major general and assigned as the 25th Chief of Chaplains of the United States Army.

As the Deputy Chief of Chaplains, Solhjem served as the chief strategist for the United States Army Chaplain Corps and senior coordinating general officer for actions assigned to Assistant Chiefs of Chaplains (Reserve Component) and the USACHCS Chief of Chaplains of the United States Army. As a member of the Armed Forces Chaplains Board, he and other members advise the Secretary of Defense and Joint Chiefs of Staff on religious, ethical and quality-of-life concerns.

Awards and decorations

References

1956 births
Living people
North Central University alumni
Assemblies of God pastors
United States Army generals
Deputy Chiefs of Chaplains of the United States Army
Chiefs of Chaplains of the United States Army
20th-century American clergy
21st-century American clergy